Jack Leon Ruby (born Jacob Leon Rubenstein; April 25, 1911January 3, 1967) was an American nightclub owner and alleged associate of the Chicago Outfit who murdered Lee Harvey Oswald on November 24, 1963, two days after Oswald was accused of the assassination of President John F. Kennedy. A Dallas jury found Ruby guilty of murdering Oswald and sentenced him to death. Ruby's conviction was later appealed, and he was to be granted a new trial; however, he became ill in prison and died of a pulmonary embolism from lung cancer on January 3, 1967.

In September 1964, the Warren Commission concluded that Ruby acted alone in killing Oswald, shooting him on impulse and out of grief over Kennedy's assassination. These findings were challenged by various critics who suggested that Ruby was involved with major figures in organized crime and that he was acting as part of an overall plot surrounding the assassination of Kennedy.

Early life and career
Ruby was born Jacob Leon Rubenstein on or around March 25 and April 25, 1911, in the Maxwell Street area of Chicago, the son of Joseph Rubenstein and Fannie Turek Rutkowski (or Rokowsky), both Polish-born Orthodox Jews from Sokołów. Ruby was the fifth of his parents' 10 surviving children. While he was growing up, his parents were often violent towards each other and frequently separated; Ruby's mother was eventually committed to a mental hospital. His troubled childhood and adolescence were marked by juvenile delinquency with time being spent in foster homes. At age 11 in 1922, he was arrested for truancy. Ruby eventually skipped school so often that he had to spend time at the Institute for Juvenile Research. Still a young man, he sold horse-racing tip sheets and various novelties, then acted as a business agent for a local refuse collectors union that later became part of the International Brotherhood of Teamsters (IBT).

From his early childhood, Ruby was nicknamed "Sparky" by those who knew him. His sister, Eva Grant, said that he acquired the nickname because he resembled a slow-moving horse named "Spark Plug" or "Sparky" in the contemporary comic strip Barney Google. ("Spark Plug" debuted as a character in the strip in 1922, when Ruby was 11.) Other accounts say that the name was given because of his quick temper. In either event, Grant stated that Ruby did not like the nickname Sparky, and was quick to fight anyone who called him that.

In the 1940s, Ruby frequented race tracks in Illinois and California. He was drafted in 1943 and served in the U.S. Army Air Forces during World War II, working as an aircraft mechanic at U.S. bases until 1946. He had an honorable record and was promoted to Private First Class. Upon discharge, in  1946, Ruby returned to Chicago.

In 1947, Ruby moved to Dallas, purportedly because of the failure of merchandise deals in Chicago and to help operate his sister's nightclub. Soon afterward he and his brothers shortened their surnames from Rubenstein to Ruby. The stated reason for this was that the name "Rubenstein" was too long and that he was "well known" as Jack Ruby. Ruby later went on to manage various nightclubs, strip clubs, and dance halls. He developed close ties to many Dallas Police officers who frequented his nightclubs, where he provided them with free liquor, prostitutes and other favors.

Ruby never married and had no children. At the time of the assassination, Ruby was living with George Senator, who referred to Ruby as "my boyfriend" during the Warren Commission hearing, but denied the two being homosexual lovers. Warren Commission lawyer Burt Griffin later told author Gerald Posner: "I'm not sure if Senator was honest with us about his relationship with Ruby. People did not advertise their homosexuality in 1963".

Illegal activities 
Some critics have said that Ruby was involved in criminal activity and linked to organized crime. He had been involved in illegal gambling, narcotics, and prostitution. He belonged to an organization known as the Yiddish Connection.

A 1956 FBI report stated that informant Eileen Curry had moved to Dallas in January with her boyfriend James Breen after jumping bail on narcotics charges. Breen told her that he had made connections with a large narcotics setup operating between Texas, Mexico, and the East, and that "James got the okay to operate through Jack Ruby of Dallas."
 
Dallas County Sheriff Steve Guthrie told the FBI that he believed that Ruby "operated some prostitution activities and other vices in his club" in Dallas.

On March 11, 1959, FBI agent Charles W. Flynn of the Dallas Office approached Ruby to become a federal informant due to his job as a night club operator, since he "might have knowledge of the criminal element in Dallas". Ruby was willing to become an informant and was contacted by the FBI eight times between March 11, 1959 and October 2, 1959, but he provided no information to the Bureau; he was not paid, and contact ceased.
 
Dallas disc jockey Kenneth Dowe testified that Ruby was known around the station for "procuring women for different people who came to town".

Character
According to the people interviewed by law enforcement and the Warren Commission, Ruby was desperate to attract attention to himself and to his club. He knew a great number of people in Dallas, but he had only a few friends. His business ventures remained unsuccessful and he was heavily in debt.

The commission received reports of Ruby's penchant for violence. He had a volatile temper, and often resorted to violence with employees who had upset him. He acted as the bouncer of his own club and beat his customers on at least 25 occasions. The fights would often end with Ruby throwing his victims down the club's stairs.

Government officials also heard stories of Ruby's eccentric and unstable behavior. He sometimes took his shirt or other clothes off in social gatherings, and then either hit his chest like a gorilla or rolled around the floor. During conversations, he could change the topic suddenly in mid-sentence. He sometimes welcomed a guest to his club, but on other nights forbade the same guest from entering. He was described by those who knew him as "a kook", "totally unpredictable", "a psycho", and "suffering from some form of disturbance".

John F. Kennedy assassination

November 21
The Warren Commission attempted to reconstruct Ruby's movements from November 21, 1963, through November 24. The Commission reported that he was attending to his duties as the proprietor of the Carousel Club located at 1312 1/2 Commerce St. in downtown Dallas and the Vegas Club in the city's Oak Lawn district from the afternoon of November 21 to the early hours of November 22.

November 22: assassination of Kennedy
According to the Warren Commission, Ruby was in the second-floor advertising offices of the Dallas Morning News, five blocks away from the Texas School Book Depository, placing weekly advertisements for his nightclubs when he learned of the assassination around 12:45 p.m. Ruby then made phone calls to his assistant at the Carousel Club and to his sister. The Commission stated that an employee of the Dallas Morning News estimated that Ruby left the newspaper's offices at 1:30 p.m., but indicated that other testimony suggested that he had left earlier. According to the Warren Commission, Ruby arrived back at the Carousel Club shortly before 1:45 p.m. to notify employees that the club would be closed that evening.

John Newnam, an employee at the newspaper's advertisement department, testified that Ruby became upset over an anti-Kennedy ad published in the Morning News that was signed by "The American Fact-Finding Committee, Bernard Weissman, Chairman". Ruby was sensitive to antisemitism and was distressed that an ad attacking the President was signed by a person with a "Jewish name". Early next morning, Ruby noticed a political billboard featuring the text "IMPEACH EARL WARREN" in block letters. Ruby's sister Eva testified that Ruby had told her that he believed that the anti-Kennedy ad and the anti-Warren sign were connected and were a plot by a "gentile" to blame the assassination on the Jews.

Ruby was seen in the halls of the Dallas Police Headquarters on several occasions after Oswald's arrest for the murder of Dallas policeman J. D. Tippit on November 22, 1963. He was present at an arranged press meeting with Oswald. A reporter asked Oswald, "Did you kill the President?" and Oswald answered, his voice breaking, "No, I have not been charged with that. In fact, nobody has said that to me yet. The first thing I heard about it was when the newspaper reporters in the hall asked me that question." A reporter told Oswald that he had been charged and Oswald looked shocked. Newsreel footage from WFAA-TV (Dallas) and NBC shows that Ruby impersonated a newspaper reporter during a press conference held by District Attorney Henry Wade at Dallas Police Headquarters that night. Wade briefed reporters that Oswald was a member of the anti-Castro Free Cuba Committee. Ruby was one of several people there who spoke up to correct Wade, saying, "Henry, that's the Fair Play for Cuba Committee", a pro-Castro organization. Ruby later told the FBI that he had his Colt Cobra .38 revolver in his right pocket during the press conference.

November 24: killing of Oswald

On November 24, Ruby drove into town with his pet dachshund Sheba to send an emergency money order at the Western Union on Main Street to one of his employees. The time stamp was 11:17 a.m. for the cash transaction on the money order. Ruby then walked half a block to the nearby Dallas police headquarters, where he made his way into the basement via either the Main Street ramp or a stairway accessible from an alleyway next to the Dallas Municipal Building. Authorities were escorting Oswald through the police basement at 11:21 a.m. CST to an armored car that was to take him to the nearby county jail, when Ruby emerged from a crowd of reporters with his .38 Colt Cobra revolver aimed at Oswald's abdomen. Ruby shot him at point blank range, mortally wounding him. The bullet entered Oswald's left side in the front part of the abdomen and caused damage to his spleen, stomach, aorta, vena cava, kidney, liver, diaphragm, and eleventh rib before coming to rest on his right side. Oswald made a cry of anguish and his manacled hands clutched at his abdomen as he writhed with pain, and he slumped to the concrete paving, where he moaned several times. Police detective Billy Combest recognized Ruby and exclaimed: "Jack, you son of a bitch!" Ruby was immediately subdued by police as a moaning Oswald was carried back into the basement level jail office. Combest asked Oswald, "Do you have anything you want to tell us now?" Oswald shook his head. He lost consciousness shortly after and was taken by ambulance to Parkland Memorial Hospital, the same hospital where Kennedy had died two days earlier. Oswald died there at 1:07 p.m.

The crowd outside the headquarters burst into applause when they heard that Oswald had been shot. A network television pool camera was broadcasting live to cover the transfer; millions of people watching on NBC witnessed the shooting as it happened and on other networks within minutes afterward. Several photographs were taken of the event, capturing the moments around when Ruby pulled the trigger. In 1964, Robert H. Jackson of the Dallas Times Herald was awarded the Pulitzer Prize for Photography for his image of the shooting of Oswald.

Prosecution

After his arrest, Ruby said that he had been distraught over President Kennedy's death and had helped the city of Dallas "redeem" itself in the eyes of the public, and that he was "saving Mrs. Kennedy the discomfiture of coming back to trial". He also claimed that he shot Oswald on the spur of the moment when the opportunity presented itself, without considering any reason for doing so. Ruby told the FBI that he was "in mourning" Friday and Saturday. He said that he cried when he heard that the President was shot, "cried a great deal" Saturday afternoon, and was depressed Saturday night. He explained that this grief was caused by him being an admirer of President Kennedy and the Kennedy family. The anguish over the assassination, Ruby stated, finally "reached the point of insanity", suddenly compelling him to shoot when Oswald walked in front of him in the basement that Sunday morning. At the time of the shooting, Ruby said that he was taking phenmetrazine, a central nervous system stimulant. Ruby asked Dallas attorney Tom Howard to represent him. Howard accepted and asked Ruby if he could think of anything that might damage his defense. Ruby responded that there would be a problem if a man by the name of "Davis" should come up. Ruby told his attorney that he "had been involved with Davis, who was a gunrunner entangled in anti-Castro efforts".

Later, Ruby replaced attorney Tom Howard with prominent San Francisco defense attorney Melvin Belli, who agreed to represent him pro bono. Ruby broke into tears at his bond hearing in January 1964, as he talked to reporters regarding the assassination of Kennedy. He said that he could not understand "how a great man like that could be lost". On March 14, 1964, Ruby was convicted of murder with malice and was sentenced to death.

Ruby's conviction was overturned by the Texas Court of Criminal Appeals on the grounds that "an oral confession of premeditation made while in police custody" should have been ruled inadmissible, because it violated a Texas criminal statute.  The court also ruled that the venue should have been changed to a Texas county other than the one in which the high-profile crime had been committed.

During the six months following Kennedy's assassination, Ruby repeatedly asked to speak to the members of the Warren Commission. The commission initially showed no interest, but Ruby's sister Eileen wrote letters to the commission and her letters became public. The Warren Commission then agreed to talk to Ruby. In June 1964, Chief Justice Earl Warren, Representative Gerald R. Ford of Michigan, and other commission members went to Dallas to see Ruby. Ruby asked Warren several times to take him to Washington D.C., saying that "my life is in danger here" and that he wanted an opportunity to make additional statements. He added that the people from whom he felt himself to be in danger were the John Birch Society of Dallas, including Edwin Walker, who he claimed were trying to falsely implicate him as being involved in a conspiracy to assassinate the President. He added: "I want to tell the truth, and I can't tell it here." Warren told Ruby that he would be unable to comply, because many legal barriers would need to be overcome, and public interest in the situation would be too heavy. Warren also told Ruby that the commission would have no way of protecting him, since it had no police powers. Ruby said that he wanted to convince President Lyndon Johnson that he was not part of any conspiracy to kill Kennedy.

Eventually, the appellate court agreed with Ruby's lawyers that he should be granted a new trial. On October 5, 1966, the court ruled that his motion for a change of venue before the original trial court should have been granted. Ruby's conviction and death sentence were overturned. Arrangements were underway for a new trial to be held in February 1967 in Wichita Falls, Texas, but Ruby was admitted to Parkland Hospital in Dallas on December 9, 1966, suffering from pneumonia. A day later, doctors discovered cancer in his liver, lungs, and brain. His condition rapidly deteriorated. According to an unnamed Associated Press source, Ruby made a final statement from his hospital bed on December 19, 1966 that he alone had been responsible for the murder of Oswald. "There is nothing to hide," Ruby said, "there was no one else.".

Death

Ruby died of a pulmonary embolism on January 3, 1967 at Parkland Hospital, the same facility where Oswald and Kennedy died. He was buried beside his parents in the Westlawn Cemetery in Norridge, Illinois.

Official investigations

Warren Commission
The Warren Commission found no evidence linking Ruby's killing of Oswald with any broader conspiracy to assassinate Kennedy. In 1964, the Warren Commission provided a detailed biography of Ruby's life and activities to help ascertain whether he was involved in a conspiracy to assassinate Kennedy. The Commission indicated that there was not a "significant link between Ruby and organized crime" and said he acted independently in killing Oswald.

Warren Commission investigator David Belin said that postal inspector Harry Holmes arrived unannounced at the Dallas police station on the morning that Ruby shot Oswald and, upon invitation by the investigators, had questioned Oswald, thus delaying his transfer by half an hour. Belin concluded that, had Ruby been part of a conspiracy, he would have been downtown 30 minutes earlier, when Oswald had been scheduled to be transferred.

In Gerald Posner's book Case Closed: Lee Harvey Oswald and the Assassination of JFK, Ruby's friends, relatives and associates claimed that he was upset over President Kennedy's death, even crying on occasions and closing his clubs for three days as a mark of respect. They also disputed the conspiracy claims, saying that Ruby's connection with gangsters was minimal at most and that he was not the sort of person who would be entrusted with an important assassination as part of a high-level conspiracy.

Dallas reporter Tony Zoppi, who knew Ruby well, claimed that one "would have to be crazy" to entrust Ruby with anything as important as a high-level plot to kill Kennedy since he "couldn't keep a secret for five minutes ... Jack was one of the most talkative guys you would ever meet. He'd be the worst fellow in the world to be part of a conspiracy, because he just plain talked too much." He and others described Ruby as the sort who enjoyed being at "the center of attention", trying to make friends with people and being more of a nuisance.

Some writers, including former Los Angeles District Attorney Vincent Bugliosi, dismiss Ruby's connections to organized crime as being highly minimal: "It is very noteworthy that without exception, not one of these conspiracy theorists knew or had ever met Jack Ruby. Without our even resorting to his family and roommate, all of whom think the suggestion of Ruby being connected to the mob is ridiculous, those who knew him, unanimously and without exception, think the notion of his being connected to the Mafia, and then killing Oswald for them, is nothing short of laughable."

Bill Alexander, who prosecuted Ruby for Oswald's murder, equally rejected any suggestions that Ruby was involved with organized crime, claiming that conspiracy theorists based it on the claim that "A knew B, and Ruby knew B back in 1950, so he must have known A, and that must be the link to the conspiracy."

Ruby's brother Earl denied allegations that Jack was involved in racketeering Chicago nightclubs, and author Gerald Posner suggested that witnesses may have confused Ruby with Harry Rubenstein, a convicted Chicago felon. Entertainment reporter Tony Zoppi was also dismissive of mob ties. He knew Ruby and described him as a "born loser".

Author Norman Mailer and others have questioned why Ruby would have left his two beloved dogs in his car if his killing of Oswald had been planned.

Other investigations and dissenting theories
 

Many critics have not accepted the conclusions of the Warren Commission and have proposed several other theories.

Ruby's motive
White House correspondent Seth Kantor was a passenger in Kennedy's motorcade. He testified that he had visited Parkland Hospital after Kennedy was shot, and that he felt a tug on his coat as he entered the hospital at about 1:30 p.m. He turned around to see Jack Ruby, who called him by his first name and shook his hand. He said that he had become acquainted with Ruby while he was a reporter for the Dallas Times Herald newspaper. According to Kantor, Ruby asked him if he thought that it would be a good idea for him to close his nightclubs for the next three nights because of the tragedy, and Kantor responded without thinking that doing so would be a good idea.

Ruby denied that he had been at Parkland Hospital and the Warren Commission dismissed Kantor's testimony, saying that the encounter at Parkland Hospital would have to have taken place in a span of a few minutes before and after 1:30 pm, as evidenced by telephone company records of calls made by both people. The commission also pointed to contradictory witness testimony and to the lack of video confirmation of Ruby at the scene. The Commission concluded that "Kantor probably did not see Ruby at Parkland Hospital" and "may have been mistaken about both the time and the place that he saw Ruby".

In 1979, the House Select Committee on Assassinations re-examined Kantor's testimony and stated, "the Warren Commission concluded that Kantor was mistaken" about his Parkland encounter with Ruby, but "the Committee determined he probably was not."

Kantor also reported that Ruby might have tampered with evidence while at Parkland. Kantor researched the Ruby case for years. He wrote in Who Was Jack Ruby?:

The mob was Ruby's "friend." And Ruby could well have been paying off an IOU the day he was used to kill Lee Harvey Oswald. Remember: "I have been used for a purpose," the way Ruby expressed it to Chief Justice Warren in their June 7, 1964 session. It would not have been hard for the mob to maneuver Ruby through the ranks of a few negotiable police.

The House Select Committee on Assassinations wrote in its 1979 Final Report:

Ruby's shooting of Oswald was not a spontaneous act, in that it involved at least some premeditation. Similarly, the committee believed it was less likely that Ruby entered the police basement without assistance, even though the assistance may have been provided with no knowledge of Ruby's intentions.... The committee was troubled by the apparently unlocked doors along the stairway route and the removal of security guards from the area of the garage nearest the stairway shortly before the shooting.... There is also evidence that the Dallas Police Department withheld relevant information from the Warren Commission concerning Ruby's entry to the scene of the Oswald transfer.

Lieutenant Billy Grammer was a dispatcher for the Dallas Police Department. He said that he received an anonymous phone call at 3 a.m. on November 24 from a man who knew his name. The caller told him that he knew of the plan to move Oswald from the basement and warned that, unless the plans were changed, "we are going to kill him". After Oswald was shot, Grammer claimed to have recognized Ruby as the caller. Grammer believed that Ruby's shooting of Oswald was "a planned event".

Detective Don Archer testified to the Warren Commission that he said to Ruby, "Jack, I think you killed him." He stated that Ruby looked him straight in the eye and said, "Well, I intended to shoot him three times." Kantor believed that Ruby's response to Archer did not suggest a spontaneous reaction, and the word "intended" implied having prior intention.

Ruby's explanation for killing Oswald would be exposed "as a fabricated legal ploy", according to the House Select Committee on Assassinations. Ruby wrote a note to attorney Joseph Tonahill: "Joe, you should know this. My first lawyer Tom Howard told me to say that I shot Oswald so that Caroline and Mrs. Kennedy wouldn't have to come to Dallas to testify. OK?"

G. Robert Blakey was chief counsel for the House Select Committee on Assassinations from 1977 to 1979, and he said: "The most plausible explanation for the murder of Oswald by Jack Ruby was that Ruby had stalked him on behalf of organized crime, trying to reach him on at least three occasions in the forty-eight hours before he silenced him forever."

Russell Moore, an acquaintance of Ruby, testified to the Commission that Ruby expressed no bitterness towards Oswald and called him "a good looking guy," comparing him to Paul Newman.

David Scheim noted in his book Contract on America that some people claimed that Ruby was upset over the weekend of the assassination, while others said that he was not. On Friday night, TV newsman Vic Robertson Jr. saw Ruby at police headquarters and said that he "appeared to be anything but under stress or strain. He seemed happy, jovial, was joking and laughing". Announcer Glen Duncan also said that Ruby "was not grieving" and seemed "happy that evidence was piling up against Oswald".

Scheim also suggests that Ruby made a "candid confession" when giving testimony to the Warren Commission. During his testimony, Ruby teared up when talking about a Saturday morning eulogy for Kennedy, but after composing himself, inexplicably said, "I must be a great actor, I tell you that." Ruby also remarked that "they didn't ask me another question: 'If I loved the President so much, why wasn't I at the parade?'" (referring to the presidential motorcade) and "it's strange that perhaps I didn't vote for President Kennedy, or didn't vote at all, that I should build up such a great affection for him".
Scheim noted that Jada, a stripper at Ruby's club, during an interview with ABC's Paul Good, remarked "I believe [Ruby] disliked Bobby Kennedy".

Schiem also noted several people who knew Ruby who claimed that the patriotic statements which Ruby professed were quite out of character. Ruby's gambling business partner Harry Hall told the FBI that "Ruby was the type who was interested in any way to make money," and he also said that he "could not conceive of Ruby doing anything out of patriotism". Jack Kelly had known Ruby casually since 1943, and he "scoffed at the idea of a patriotic motive being involved by Ruby in the slaying of Oswald." He said that he "could not see Ruby" killing Oswald "out of patriotism," but rather "for publicity or...for money". Ruby's friend Paul Jones told the FBI that he doubted that Ruby "would have become emotionally upset and killed Oswald on the spur of the moment. He felt Ruby would have done it for money."

Ruby's lawyers, led by Sam Houston Clinton, appealed to the Texas Court of Criminal Appeals after his 1964 conviction, the highest criminal court in Texas. Ruby's lawyers argued that he could not have received a fair trial in Dallas because of the excessive publicity surrounding the case. Ruby conducted a brief televised news conference in March 1965, a year after his conviction. He stated: "Everything pertaining to what's happening has never come to the surface. The world will never know the true facts of what occurred, my motives. The people who had so much to gain, and had such an ulterior motive for putting me in the position I'm in, will never let the true facts come above board to the world." A reporter asked, "Are these people in very high positions, Jack?", and he responded, "Yes."

Kantor speculated in 1978 that the man by the name of "Davis" that Ruby mentioned to attorney Tom Howard may have been Thomas Eli Davis III, a CIA-connected mercenary.

Dallas Deputy Sheriff Al Maddox claimed: "Ruby told me, he said, 'Well, they injected me for a cold.' He said it was cancer cells. That's what he told me, Ruby did. I said you don't believe that bullshit. He said, 'I damn sure do!' One day when I started to leave, Ruby shook hands with me and I could feel a piece of paper in his palm." It was a note in which Ruby claimed that he was part of a conspiracy, and that his role was to silence Oswald. Not long before Ruby died, according to an article in the London Sunday Times, he told psychiatrist Werner Teuter that the assassination was "an act of overthrowing the government" and that he knew "who had President Kennedy killed". He added: "I am doomed. I do not want to die. But I am not insane. I was framed to kill Oswald."

David Scheim presented evidence that Mafia leaders Carlos Marcello and Santo Trafficante, Jr. and organized labor leader Jimmy Hoffa ordered the assassination of Kennedy. Scheim cited in particular a 25-fold increase in the number of out-of-state telephone calls from Jack Ruby to associates of these crime bosses in the months before the assassination.  According to author Vincent Bugliosi, both the Warren Commission and the House Select Committee on Assassinations determined that all of these calls were related to Ruby seeking help from the American Guild of Variety Artists in a matter concerning two of his competitors. The House Select Committee on Assassinations report stated that "most of Ruby's phone calls during late 1963 were related to his labor troubles. In the light of the identity of some of the individuals with whom Ruby spoke, however, the possibility of other matters being discussed could not be dismissed."

Bill Bonanno, son of New York Mafia boss Joseph Bonanno, stated in Bound By Honor that he realized that certain Mafia families were involved in the JFK assassination when Ruby killed Oswald, since Bonanno was aware that Ruby was an associate of Chicago mobster Sam Giancana.

Associations with organized crime and gunrunning allegations
The House Select Committee on Assassinations undertook a similar investigation of Ruby in 1979, 15 years after the written report, and said that he "had a significant number of associations and direct and indirect contacts with underworld figures" and "the Dallas criminal element," but that he was not a member of organized crime.

Ruby was known to have been acquainted with both the police and the Mafia. The HSCA said that Ruby had known Chicago mobster Sam Giancana (1908–1975) and Joseph Campisi (1918–1990) since 1947, and had been seen with them on many occasions. After an investigation of Joe Campisi, the HSCA found:

While Campisi's technical characterization in federal law enforcement records as an organized crime member has ranged from definite to suspected to negative, it is clear that he was an associate or friend of many Dallas-based organized crime members, particularly Joseph Civello, during the time he was the head of the Dallas organization. There was no indication that Campisi had engaged in any specific organized crime-related activities.

G. Robert Blakey was the chief counsel for the HSCA, and he called Campisi "the No. 2 man in the mob in Dallas." He wrote in a 1993 article for The Washington Post: "It is difficult to dispute the underworld pedigree of Jack Ruby, though the Warren Commission did it in 1964. Similarly, a PBS Frontline investigation into the connections between Ruby and Dallas organized crime figures reported the following:

In 1963, Sam and Joe Campisi were leading figures in the Dallas underworld. Jack knew the Campisis and had been seen with them on many occasions. The Campisis were lieutenants of Carlos Marcello, the Mafia boss who had reportedly talked of killing the President.

On the night before Kennedy was assassinated, Ruby and Ralph Paul had dinner together at the Egyptian Lounge run by Joe and Sam Campisi. After Ruby was jailed for killing Lee Harvey Oswald, Joe Campisi "regularly visited" him.

Howard P. Willens was the third-highest official in the Department of Justice and assistant counsel to J. Lee Rankin, and he helped organize the Warren Commission. Willens also outlined the commission's investigative priorities and terminated an investigation of Ruby's Cuban related activities. An FBI report states that Willens' father had been Tony Accardo's next-door neighbor going back to 1958. In 1946, Tony Accardo allegedly asked Jack Ruby to go to Texas with Mafia associates Pat Manno and Romie Nappi to make sure that Dallas County Sheriff Steve Gutherie would acquiesce to the Mafia's expansion into Dallas.

Ruby went to see a man named Lewis McWillie in Cuba four years before the assassination of Kennedy. McWillie had previously run illegal gambling establishments in Texas, and Ruby considered him one of his closest friends. McWillie was supervising gambling activities at Havana's Tropicana Club when Ruby visited him in August 1959. Ruby told the Warren Commission that his August trip to Cuba was merely a social visit at the invitation of McWillie. The HSCA later concluded that Ruby "most likely was serving as a courier for gambling interests". The committee also found circumstantial but not conclusive evidence that "Ruby met with Santo Trafficante in Cuba sometime in 1959."

James E. Beaird claimed to be a poker-playing friend of Ruby, and he told The Dallas Morning News and the FBI that Ruby smuggled guns and ammunition from Galveston Bay, Texas to Fidel Castro's guerrillas in Cuba in the late 1950s. Beaird said that Ruby "was in it for the money. It wouldn't matter which side, just the one that would pay him the most." Beaird said that the guns were stored in a two-story house near the waterfront, and that he saw Ruby and his associates load "many boxes of new guns, including automatic rifles and handguns" on a 50-foot military-surplus boat. He claimed that "each time that the boat left with guns and ammunition, Jack Ruby was on the boat."

References

Further reading
 
 
 
 
 
 
 
 
 
Almog, Oz,  Kosher Nostra Jüdische Gangster in Amerika, 1890–1980 ; Jüdischen Museum der Stadt Wien ; 2003, Text Oz Almog, Erich Metz,

External links
 The Warren Commission Report, Appendix XVI: A Biography of Jack Ruby
 Jack Ruby --Mobster, Intelligence Agent, or Small-time Hustler?
 An article on Ruby's family background and childhood
 Testimony of Earl Ruby
 In Defense of Jack Ruby 
 Jack Ruby: Dallas' Original J.R.

1911 births
1967 deaths
Age controversies
United States Army Air Forces personnel of World War II
American people of Polish-Jewish descent
American people convicted of murder
American people who died in prison custody
American prisoners sentenced to death
American pimps
Burials at Westlawn Cemetery
Businesspeople from Chicago
Criminals from Texas
Deaths from brain cancer in the United States
Deaths from cancer in Texas
Deaths from liver cancer
Deaths from lung cancer
Deaths from pulmonary embolism
Jewish American military personnel
Jewish American gangsters
Military personnel from Illinois
Nightclub owners
Overturned convictions in the United States
People associated with the assassination of John F. Kennedy
People convicted of murder by Texas
Prisoners sentenced to death by Texas
Prisoners who died in Texas detention
United States Army Air Forces soldiers